Jesse Shearer Heiges (October 6, 1871 – January 17, 1955) was an American college football coach and college administrator. He served as the head football coach at Shippensburg University of Pennsylvania—then known as Shippensburg Normal College—in 1894. He was also the school's first dean of instruction, from 1901 to 1934.

References

External links
 

1871 births
1955 deaths
Shippensburg Red Raiders football coaches
People from Clearfield County, Pennsylvania
Coaches of American football from Pennsylvania